The Royal Theatre Toone, often simply referred to as Toone, is a folkloric theatre of marionettes in central Brussels, Belgium, active since 1830, and the only traditional Brussels puppet theatre still in operation.

Originally founded by Antoine "Toone" Genty in the Marolles/Marollen district of Brussels, since 1966, the theatre has been located at the end of two narrow alleyways, at 66, /, near the Grand-Place/Grote Markt (Brussels' main square). The theatre's premises also house a tavern and a small puppetry museum. The current director is Nicolas Géal, also known as Toone VIII.

The theatre still puts on puppet plays in the Brusselian dialect (also sometimes referred to as Marols or Marollien), the traditional Brabantian dialect of Brussels. Performances are also given in other languages interspersed with Brusselian, always in the spirit of zwanze, a sarcastic form of folk humour considered typical of Brussels.

History

Early history
Around 1830, Antoine "Toone" Genty (1804–1890) opened his poechenellenkelder (literally "puppet cellar"), a traditional theatre of marionettes in the Marolles/Marollen district of Brussels. The origin of Brussels' puppetry stems three centuries earlier from an order of Philip II of Spain, son of Charles V, who, hated by the population, had closed the city's theatres to prevent them from becoming meeting places likely to encourage hostility towards the Spanish authority. The people of Brussels had then replaced the actors with poechenelles ("puppets") in underground theatres.

At the start of the 19th century, puppet theatres were one of the most successful entertainment options for adults in Brussels' working-class neighbourhoods. They allowed for great freedom of tone, using a varied repertoire borrowed from popular legends, stories of chivalry, operas or even religious or historical pieces, cut into acts and interpreted very freely. They were also a mode of popular education. Indeed, illiterate people could not afford the opera or the big theatres. The puppet shows thus allowed them to keep abreast of cultural news. This popular form of entertainment still exists and has grown today into the Royal Theatre Toone.

20th century

Since the 1930s, renowned Belgian artists, writers, and patrons have taken part in the defence of this heritage, among them the avant-garde dramatist Michel de Ghelderode (1898–1962), who also wrote plays for the theatre. Later on, some of his other works were adapted to theatre plays by the current owners; José Géal (also known as Toone VII), and his son Nicolas (also known as Toone VIII).

The Royal Theatre Toone was relocated in 1963 by José Géal (or Toone VII) to its current premises, a building dating from 1696 on the /, near the Grand-Place in central Brussels. The building which now houses the theatre and the alleyway where it is located have been designated as a protected ensemble since 27 February 1997.

21st century

Until 2018, the permanent museum of Toone was located on the first floor of the main building, and could be visited free of charge during performance hours. As part of extension works, three houses adjacent to the historic building were acquired and fully renovated thanks to a contribution of €1.3 million from Beliris. The main goal of these works, which lasted two years, was to improve accessibility and comfort for visitors, artists and suppliers, as well as to allow access to the museum outside performance hours.

A proposal is underway for the theatre to obtain from UNESCO the status of Masterpiece of the Oral and Intangible Heritage of Humanity, a status already enjoyed by some eminent fellow puppeteers of popular tradition.

Ownership
Since the theatre's humble foundation in the Marolles in 1830, and during its eventful history, nine showmen have succeeded the Toone dynasty. The transition does not necessarily take place from father to son, nor even within the same family, but is often transmitted through apprenticeship with the approval of the public, the narrator being enthroned by the previous owner. After Genty, the name Toone (Brussels' diminutive of Antoine) was adopted by all of the theatre's unrelated (with the exception of two) successive owners. In 2003, the eighth "generation", Toone VIII, took office.

Historical owners
 Toone I, known as Toone the Elder: Antoine Genty (1804–1890), marollien, car painter by day and puppeteer by night. He could neither read nor write and made his own puppets. He cared little for historical truth and recounted popular legends, medieval epics and religiously inspired plays to a loyal audience, during a 45-year career.
 Toone II, known as Jan van de Marmit: François Taelemans (1848–1895), marollien, painter and friend of Toone I. He apprenticed as a puppeteer alongside Toone the Elder and succeeded him whilst keeping up the tradition. He had to change "puppet cellars" several times for hygiene and safety reasons.
 Toone III: after Toone II’s death, a turbulent period followed. Toone’s reputation was envied and around fifteen competing theatres attempted to appropriate the name. Two serious contenders claimed the title: 
 Toone III, known as Toone de Locrel: Georges Hembauf (1866–1898), marollien, workman. Trained by Toone II, he gave his theatre a new dimension by adding to it a new repertoire, sets and puppets, which allowed him to keep his audience, despite the competition. His son was named Toone IV, the first hereditary succession.
 Toone III, known as Jan de Crol: Jean-Antoine Schoonenburg (1852–1926), marollien, hatter. Initiated with Toone the Elder, he resorted to a more evolved method of playwriting: he read novels, took notes, developed a canvas, and improvised the dialogues in front of his audience. His performances could sometimes last two months during which, every evening, the same regulars would come watch the show. Forced to give up the profession, which had become unprofitable, he ceded his theatre to Daniel Vanlandewijck, future Toone V, and hanged himself among his puppets.
 Toone IV: Jean-Baptiste Hembauf (1884–1966), marollien, son of Toone de Locrel. Associated with a puppet maker, Antoine Taelemans (son of Toone II), he directed his theatre for 30 years. However, with the break of World War I and the appearance of cinema, Toone IV was forced to close the doors of his theatre. The Amis de la marionnette ("Friends of the puppet"), a group of patrons, safeguarded the Brussels puppets and allowed Toone IV to resume his activities. He created Le mystère de la Passion, a play by Michel de Ghelderode written from oral tradition.
 Toone V: Daniel Vanlandewijck (1888–1938), factory worker. He bought Jan de Crol 's practice. Victim of an audience crisis and increasing hygiene requirements, he gave up the profession and sold his puppets. Bought by the Amis de la marionnette, the heritage was fortunately preserved.
 Toone VI: Pierre Welleman (1892–1974), workman. First associated with Toone V, he then succeeded him with his four sons. During World War II, a bomb fell next to his workshop and destroyed 75 puppets. Moreover, television and football represented new competitors. Struck with expropriation, Toone VI, discouraged, began to sell his puppets.

Current owners
 Toone VII: José Géal (1931–), comedian, he discovered the Toone Theatre and founded his own company. When in 1963, exhausted by the difficulties encountered in safeguarding this folklore, Toone VI stopped playing, José Géal officially replaced him as Toone VII. As he did not find an ideal place to set up his theatre in the Marolles, he moved to the current building, a stone's throw away from the Grand-Place. In 1971, the City of Brussels bought this house to help Géal keep his puppets alive. Far from looking towards the past, Toone VII opened the Royal Theatre Toone to Europe and the world by updating the repertoire and translating his shows into English, but also Spanish, Italian and German (always interspersed with the Brussels dialect), thereby attracting a new audience. Tourists, students, the faithful and the curious are now replacing the marollien spectators. He was made Officer of the Order of Leopold in 2004.
 Toone VIII: Nicolas Géal (1980–), comedian, son of Toone VII, he was crowned Toone VIII on 10 December 2003 at Brussels' Town Hall, under the aegis of the then-mayor of Brussels, Freddy Thielemans. His first creation in 2006 was a Romeo and Juliet after William Shakespeare.

Practical information

Location and accessibility
The theatre is located north of the Grand-Place, at the end of two narrow alleyways known as the / and the / (themselves located at, 66, /). The district, commonly called Îlot Sacré since the 1960s, due to its resistance to demolition projects, is located within the perimeter of the Grand-Place and consists of very dense city blocks testifying to the urban organisation of Brussels during the Middle Ages. The old buildings, meanwhile, belong to the so-called "reconstruction" period which followed the bombardment of the city in 1695.

Opening hours
The theatre is open all year round, except in January. At least four shows are organised per week, every Thursday, Friday and Saturday at 8:30 p.m., and on Saturdays also at 4:00 p.m. Shows can be played in short version (+/- 45 minutes) or in full version (+/- 2 hours). The folkloric tavern on the ground floor is open every day from 12:00 to 24:00, except Monday (closing day).

Gallery

See also

 History of Brussels
 Culture of Belgium
 Ommegang of Brussels
 Meyboom
 Saint-Verhaegen

References

Notes

Bibliography
 
 
 
 

Theatres in Brussels
Culture in Brussels
Tourist attractions in Brussels
City of Brussels
Belgian folklore